is a dam in Ino, Kōchi Prefecture, Japan.

References

Dams in Kōchi Prefecture